Lucile Fairbanks (1917–1999) was an American actress who appeared in eleven feature films between 1939 and 1942, playing a lead role in A Fugitive from Justice (1940) and Passage from Hong Kong (1941).

Personal
She was the niece of Douglas Fairbanks. She was married to Hollywood writer-director Owen Crump.

Filmography

Trivia
Fairbanks tested for the part of the second Mrs. de Winter in the Alfred Hitchcock film Rebecca (1940). Hitchcock felt she had a "sincere and naive hopefulness", but did not take her audition seriously. Joan Fontaine was ultimately cast in the role.

References

External links 

 
 

1917 births
1999 deaths
American film actresses
20th-century American actresses